A list of all owners with a significant interest (a stake above 10%) within English football clubs: including their estimated net worth and sources of wealth.

Premier League

EFL Championship

League One

League Two

See also 

List of NRL club owners
List of Super League rugby league club owners
List of professional sports team owners

Notes

References 

Directors of football clubs in England
Owners
Sports owners